Ľubor Štark (born 28 January 1953 in Nitra) is a Czechoslovak sprint canoeist who competed in the late 1970s. He finished ninth in the K-1 1000 m event at the 1976 Summer Olympics in Montreal.

References
 Sports-reference.com profile

Canoeists at the 1976 Summer Olympics
Olympic canoeists of Czechoslovakia
Czechoslovak male canoeists
Slovak male canoeists
1953 births
Living people
Sportspeople from Nitra